The 1988 Miami Redskins football team was an American football team that represented Miami University in the Mid-American Conference (MAC) during the 1988 NCAA Division I-A football season. In its sixth season under head coach Tim Rose, the team compiled a 0–10–1 record (0–7–1 against MAC opponents), finished in ninth and last place in the MAC, and were outscored by all opponents by a combined total of 361 to 167.

Schedule

References

Miami
Miami RedHawks football seasons
College football winless seasons
Miami Redskins football